Bromide is a town in Coal and Johnston counties in the U.S. state of Oklahoma. The population was 165 at the 2010 census.

The area around Bromide was noted for its mineral springs, and the bromide content of the water gave the town its name. It was also noted for limestone quarrying and the potential to produce manganese. Proposals to promote economic growth from these assets never materialized.

History
Bromide was founded by Judge William H. Jackson, a former superintendent of the nearby Wapanucka Academy, who recognized the site near several mineral springs as a potential tourist attraction. The community was initially called "Juanita" (1905 - 1906), then "Zenobia" (1906 - 1907), before it was named "Bromide". It incorporated in July 1908. Juanita and Zenobia were the names of two of Jackson's daughters. The name "Bromide" was chosen because of the high content of bromine in the mineral water.

Before Oklahoma statehood, the townsite was part of the Chickasaw Nation. Native Americans were well acquainted with the mineral springs in the area. The Chickasaws called these Oka-Alichi (Medicine Water) or Hopi Kuli (Salt Springs), and believed that the waters had medicinal power, especially for "rheumatism, diseases of the stomach, kidney and bladder ailments, [and] nerve and skin problems".

The first large business in Bromide was a limestone quarry, established by Robert Galbreath Jr., a Tulsa businessman. Stone became economically important about 1911, when the Missouri, Oklahoma and Gulf (MO&G) Railway (later bought by the Kansas, Oklahoma & Gulf (KO&G)) built a spur into Bromide. A rock-crushing plant was built just outside the city. Galbreath built a three-story hotel from rock quarried there. The KO&G promoted Bromide as "the best health resort in the southwestern states". It also ran weekly excursions to the city. Three more hotels, a bathhouse, and a swimming pool were added to support the tourist trade. By 1920, the population had reached 520. The Great Depression dried up the tourist trade. The population of Bromide fell to 352 in 1930, 258 in 1950, and to 180 in 1980. KO&G abandoned its line in 1950.

Manganese (chemical symbol: Mn) ore was discovered in the vicinity of Bromide in 1890. A report published by the U.S. Geological Survey (USGS) stated that the ore deposits were small and could not yield high grade ore (more than 45 percent Mn). However, during World War I, steel producers began accepting ores as low as 35 percent Mn. The USGS report said that about 5,000 tons of ore containing 35 to 40 percent Mn could be produced from the Bromide area deposits. Oilman Robert Galbreath evidently thought this could become sufficiently profitable to be a worthwhile investment. However, the Great Depression put an end to the concept.

The nearby Wapanucka Academy site is listed in the National Register of Historic Places (NR72001065).

Geography
Bromide is located in northeastern Johnston County and southwestern Coal County at  (34.417909, -96.494569), with the developed townsite mostly on the Johnston side of the county line. It is the same distance southwest of Coalgate, the Coal county seat.

Demographics

As of the census of 2000, there were 163 people, 63 households, and 43 families residing in the town. The racial makeup of the town was 71.17% White, 14.72% Native American, 5.52% from other races, and 8.59% from two or more races. Hispanic or Latino of any race were 4.91% of the population.

There were 63 households, out of which 33.3% had children under the age of 18 living with them, 54.0% were married couples living together, 9.5% had a female householder with no husband present, and 30.2% were non-families. 27.0% of all households were made up of individuals, and 11.1% had someone living alone who was 65 years of age or older. The average household size was 2.59 and the average family size was 3.18.

In the town, the population was spread out, with 31.3% under the age of 18, 6.1% from 18 to 24, 28.2% from 25 to 44, 18.4% from 45 to 64, and 16.0% who were 65 years of age or older. The median age was 36 years. For every 100 females, there were 114.5 males. For every 100 females age 18 and over, there were 96.5 males.

The median income for a household in the town was $21,458, and the median income for a family was $23,333. Males had a median income of $21,563 versus $11,500 for females. The per capita income for the town was $10,427. About 20.5% of families and 25.7% of the population were below the poverty line, including 45.8% of those under the age of eighteen and none of those 65 or over.

Notable person
Overton James was born in Bromide on July 21, 1925. He became governor of the Chickasaw Nation in 1963.

References

Further reading
 "Bromide," Vertical File, Research Division, Oklahoma Historical Society, Oklahoma City.
 Berry, Shelley, et al., Small Towns, Ghost Memories of Oklahoma: A Photographic Narrative of Hamlets and Villages Throughout Oklahoma's Seventy-seven Counties (Virginia Beach, Va.: Donning Co., 2004).
 Heddlesten, Cathey, "Bromide,"
 Mitchell, Marshal Don.  Bromide Oklahoma Centennial:  From Boastown to Ghostown, Our Hometown  2007.  
 Morris, John W., Ghost Towns of Oklahoma (Norman: University of Oklahoma Press, 1977).
 Reubin, Carl, ed., Johnston County History, 1855-1979 (Tishomingo, Okla.: Johnston County Historical Society,1979).

External links
 Encyclopedia of Oklahoma History and Culture - Bromide
 Bromide - Ghost Town
 Red River Historian - Bromide

Towns in Coal County, Oklahoma
Towns in Johnston County, Oklahoma
Towns in Oklahoma
1908 establishments in Oklahoma
Ghost towns in Oklahoma